Motherhood Hospitals by Rhea Healthcare is a speciality hospital chain offering premium maternity, children and fertility healthcare services. Headquartered in Bengaluru, India and was founded by Dr Mohammed Rehan Sayeed, a cardio-thoracic surgeon. Motherhood has 12 hospitals and clinics in Bengaluru, Mysore, Chennai, Coimbatore, Pune, Mumbai, Chandigarh, Gurgaon, Indore and Noida. They provide gynecology and pediatric services.

History 
Dr Rehan Sayeed along with his father-in-law, Indian actor Mammootty, invested in Rhea Healthcare to start a premium birthing hospital in Bengaluru in the year 2010. Dr Mohammed Rehan Sayeed, who had previously worked as a cardio-thoracic surgeon in Cleveland, USA, introduced to India the standards of maternal healthcare observed in the USA.

Specialities 
Motherhood Hospitals specialises in all-inclusive antenatal and postnatal maternity care services with 4D scans, lactation, nutritional consultation and Lamaze therapy along with treatment for foetal anomaly. It also provides gynecological services to women of all ages, pediatrics care, minimally invasive surgeries, infertility treatments and stem cell banking.

The departments at Motherhood Hospitals consist of Department of Obstetrics, Department of Gynecology, Department of Fertility, Department of Pediatrics', Department of Neonatal Care, Department of Fetal Medicine, Department of Radiology, Department of General Surgery, Department of Internal Medicine, Department of Cosmetology and Department of Dietetics and Nutrition.

Funding 
In 2010, TPG Growth invested $33 million in Motherhood Hospital chain.

References 

.     6. https://www.motherhoodivf.com

Hospital networks in India